Alex Williams is an Australian actor who played the lead role of Julian Assange in the 2012 television film Underground: The Julian Assange Story.

Originally from the northern Perth suburb of Sorrento, Williams attended Mount Lawley Senior High School's Specialist Visual & Performing Arts (SVAPA) Program before moving to  St Stephen's School in neighbouring Duncraig where he graduated in 2008. He then attended the Western Australian Academy of Performing Arts.  His first audition after graduation was for the role of Assange.  His performance alongside experienced actors Rachel Griffiths and Anthony LaPaglia was critically acclaimed. In 2014, Williams appeared in the 2014 Australian film The Reckoning as a supporting character named AJ. In 2016, he played Romeo in Bell Shakespeare's production of Romeo and Juliet.

In 2016, Williams played the role of Australian motor racing driver John "Slug" Harvey in the miniseries Brock, which aired on Network Ten. He currently plays cricket for Mount Lawley Inglewood Panthers.

In 2022, Williams was cast to play cricketer Shane Warne in the miniseries Warnie; the series is scheduled for release in 2023.

Filmography
Underground: The Julian Assange Story (2012) – Julian Assange
INXS: Never Tear Us Apart (2014) – Kirk Pengilly
The Reckoning (2014) – AJ
Brock (2016) – John "Slug" Harvey
Home and Away (2022-23) - Jacob Cameron
Warnie (miniseries) (2023) - Shane Warne

References

External links

Living people
Australian male television actors
Male actors from Perth, Western Australia
Year of birth missing (living people)